The Echo is an American music venue and nightclub, located in the Echo Park neighborhood of Los Angeles, California. The venue is also known for their punk rock shows, which attract long lines of fans.

History

The Echo opened in 2001. Prior to that, the space was used as a Latin-themed restaurant/nightclub. The front of the building still sports the original name "Nayarit."

In 2019, it was announced that Spaceland Productions, who owned and operated The Echo, The Echoplex, and other venues was sold to Live Nation Entertainment.

Notable performers

Individuals

 Beck
 Bennett Coast
 Billie Eilish
 Casiotone for the Painfully Alone
 Cold Cave
 Daedelus
Dntel

Lady Sovereign
 Maria Taylor
 Nite Jewel
 John Vanderslice
 Jesse Rutherford
 St. Vincent

Groups

 Air Traffic
 The Airborne Toxic Event
 An Albatross
 Autolux
 Bad Religion 
 Band of Horses
 The Decemberists
 Deerhoof
 The Elected
 FIDLAR
 Fool's Gold
 Foster the People
 GoGoGo Airheart
 Gravy Train!!!!
 Jenny Lewis with the Watson Twins
 Lucero
 LCD Soundsystem
 I Love You but I've Chosen Darkness
 I See Hawks in L.A.
 Pixies
 Psapp
 Rancid
 Say Hi
 Spiritualized
 Thao & The Get Down Stay Down
 The Blasters
 The Subhumans
 The Violet Lights
 Wolf Eyes

See also

 Architecture of the United States 
 Echoplex, another Los Angeles music venue owned by the same people as The Echo
 List of buildings and structures
 Music of Los Angeles
 Spaceland, another nightclub in Los Angeles

External links
 , the venue's official website

Year of establishment missing
Music venues in Los Angeles
Echo Park, Los Angeles
Nightclubs in Los Angeles County, California
Punk rock venues